Valentin Yakovlevich Tugarin (5 May 1931 – 1998) was a Soviet football manager.

Coach career
In 1971, Tugarin worked at the club FC Avanhard Sevastopol as a director of the club. Since 1965, coached FC Desna Chernihiv, Avanhard Rivne, Spartak Ivano-Frankivsk, Kryvbas Kryvyi Rih, Atlantyka Sevastopol and Vulkan Petropavlovsk-Kamchatsky.

External links
 

1931 births
1998 deaths
Soviet footballers
Soviet football managers
FC Desna Chernihiv managers
NK Veres Rivne managers
FC Spartak Ivano-Frankivsk managers
FC Kryvbas Kryvyi Rih managers
FC Chayka Sevastopol managers
FC Dnipro Cherkasy managers

Association footballers not categorized by position